The Medal "For the Defence of Moscow" was a World War II campaign medal of the Soviet Union awarded to military and civilians who had participated in the Battle of Moscow.

History 
The Medal "For the Defence of Moscow" was established on May 1, 1944 by decree of the Presidium of the Supreme Soviet of the USSR.  Its statute was later amended by Resolution of the Presidium of the Supreme Soviet on March 8, 1945.  The medal's statute was finally amended one last time on July 18, 1980 by decree of the Presidium of the Supreme Soviet of the USSR № 2523-X.

Statute 
The Medal "For the Defence of Moscow" was awarded to all participants in the defence of Moscow - soldiers of the Red Army, troops of the NKVD, as well as persons from the civilian population who took part in the defence of Moscow during the battle of Moscow.  

The Resolution of the Presidium of the Supreme Soviet of March 8, 1945 granted the petition of Yaroslavl regional organizations to award the medal "For the Defence of Moscow" to the most distinguished participants in the construction of defensive structures in the Moscow area by the civilian population of the Yaroslavl region.

Award of the medal was made on behalf of the Presidium of the Supreme Soviet of the USSR on the basis of documents attesting to actual participation in the defence of Moscow issued by the unit commander, the chief of the military medical establishment or by a relevant provincial or municipal authority.  Serving military personnel received the medal from their unit commander, retirees from military service received the medal from a regional, municipal or district military commissioner in the recipient's community, members of the civilian population, participants in the defence of Moscow received their medal from regional or city Councils of People's Deputies.  For the defenders who died in battle or prior to the establishment of the medal, it was awarded posthumously to the family.  

The Medal "For the Defence of Moscow" was worn on the left side of the chest and in the presence of other awards of the USSR, it was located immediately after the Medal "For the Defence of Leningrad".If worn in the presence or Orders or medals of the Russian Federation, the latter have precedence.

Description 
The Medal "For the Defence of Moscow" is a 32mm in diameter circular brass medal.  On the obverse in the background, the Kremlin wall, in front of the wall at lower center, the left front of a T-34 tank with a group of soldiers on it, below the tank near the medal's lower rim, a relief five pointed star in the center of a laurel wreath going halfway up the medal's circumference on the left and right.  To the left of the tank, the relief image of the monument to Minin and Pozharsky, and to the right of the tank, a Kremlin tower.  Over the Kremlin wall, the dome of the Senate building with a hammer and sickle flag waving from its rooftop mast, in the sky above, five combat aircraft flying towards the left.  Along the upper circumference of the medal, the relief inscription in prominent letters "FOR DEFENCE OF MOSCOW".  On the reverse near the top, the relief image of the hammer and sickle, below the image, the relief inscription in three rows "FOR OUR SOVIET MOTHERLAND".  

The Medal "For the Defence of Moscow" was secured by a ring through the medal suspension loop to a standard Soviet pentagonal mount covered by a 24 mm wide silk moiré ribbon with 2 mm red edge stripes and five alternating 4 mm wide olive green, red, olive green, red, olive green stripes.

Recipients (partial list) 
The individuals below were all recipients of the Medal "For the Defence of Moscow".

Admiral of the Fleet Ivan Stepanovich Isakov
Marshal of Aviation Sergei Alexandrovich Khudyakov
Colonel General Leonid Mikhaylovich Sandalov
Surgeon-General of the Red Army Nikolay Nilovich Burdenko
People's Artist of the USSR Nikolay Aleksandrovich Annenkov
Veteran of World War 2 actor and director Yuri Petrovich Lyubimov
Marshal of the Soviet Union Sergey Fyodorovich Akhromeyev
Marshal of the Soviet Union Vasily Danilovich Sokolovsky
Marshal of the Soviet Union Konstantin Rokossovsky
Marshal of the Soviet Union Leonid Aleksandrovich Govorov
Marshal of the Soviet Union Ivan Stepanovich Konev
Marshal of the Soviet Union Ivan Ignatyevich Yakubovsky
Major General Vladimir Sergeyevich Ilyushin
Marshal of the Soviet Union Aleksandr Mikhaylovich Vasilevsky
Marshal of the Soviet Union Boris Mikhailovitch Shaposhnikov
Composer and pianist Tikhon Nikolayevich Khrennikov
Marshal of the Soviet Union Dmitriy Feodorovich Ustinov
Marshal of the Soviet Union Semyon Konstantinovich Timoshenko
Marshal of the Soviet Union Georgy Konstantinovich Zhukov
Admiral of the Fleet Nikolay Gerasimovich Kuznetsov
Marshal of the Soviet Union Kliment Yefremovich Voroshilov
Army General Yakov Grigorevich Kreizer
Army General Stanislav Gilyarovich Poplavsky
Hero of Socialist Labour Nikolay Vasilyevich Belov
Rocket designer Boris Evseyevich Chertok
Sculptor Lev Efimovich Kerbel
People's Artist of the USSR Olga Vasiliyevna Lepeshinskaya
Army General Sergei Matveevich Shtemenko
Marshal of Artillery Vasily Ivanovich Kazakov
Army General Mikhail Sergeevich Malinin
Politician Vladimir Ivanovich Dolgikh
Writer Aleksey Silych Novikov-Priboi
Colonel Baurzhan Momyshuly
War correspondent Pyotr Andreyevich Pavlenko
Aviation scientist Max Arkadyevich Taitz

See also 
Awards and decorations of the Soviet Union
Hero City
Yaroslavl

References

External links 

 Legal Library of the USSR

Soviet campaign medals
Military awards and decorations of the Soviet Union
Awards established in 1944